Hamilton is a city in Hancock County, Illinois, United States. The population was 2,951 at the 2010 census, a decline from 3,029 in 2000. The city is located directly across the Mississippi River from Keokuk, Iowa. Hamilton is the largest city in Hancock County.

History

Hamilton was laid out in 1852 by several men in the area, including Samuel Gordon and Bryant Bartlett. Hamilton was officially incorporated as a town in 1854, and then re-incorporated as a city in 1859. Artois Hamilton, for whom the town was named, was also active in the early history of the town.

Geography
Hamilton and Keokuk share Lock & Dam 19 on the Mississippi River.  The dam has the largest fall of any on the Mississippi and the power house supplies a majority of the electricity for St. Louis, MO.  Lake Cooper, formed above the dam, represents the widest span of the Mississippi between Montrose, IA and Nauvoo, IL.

Demographics

As of the census of 2000, there were 3,029 people, 1,223 households, and 805 families residing in the city. The racial makeup of the city was 98.18% White, 0.56% African American, 0.17% Native American, 0.43% Asian,  and 0.43% from two or more races. Hispanic or Latino of any race were 0.79% of the population.

There were 1,223 households, out of which 28.6% had children under the age of 18 living with them, 55.4% were married couples living together, 8.0% had a female householder with no husband present, and 34.1% were non-families. 29.2% of all households were made up of individuals, and 13.9% had someone living alone who was 65 years of age or older.  The average household size was 2.39 and the average family size was 2.94.

In the city, the population was spread out, with 22.9% under the age of 18, 8.1% from 18 to 24, 26.3% from 25 to 44, 24.9% from 45 to 64, and 17.9% who were 65 years of age or older.  The median age was 40 years. For every 100 females, there were 91.0 males.  For every 100 females age 18 and over, there were 85.9 males.

The median income for a household in the city was $40,179, and the median income for a family was $48,935. Males had a median income of $32,149 versus $21,587 for females. The per capita income for the city was $18,775.  About 4.6% of families and 7.1% of the population were below the poverty line, including 4.5% of those under age 18 and 11.8% of those age 65 or over.

Education
Hamilton Community Unit School District #328 consists of Hamilton Elementary, Hamilton Junior High School, and Hamilton High School.
The school's nickname is the Cardinals, but is switching over to Titans with the sports co-op with Warsaw and Nauvoo schools. The only sports that will still be "Cardinals" are Scholastic Bowl and Junior High and Elementary sports. In 2008, the newly co-oped West Hancock (Hamilton, Warsaw, Nauvoo-Colusa) Girls basketball team took first place in the IHSA Class 2A Championship. It is the first year of the co-op basketball team, and their first championship.

Notable people

 Russell Lee Arms, actor and singer who starred on Your Hit Parade television program; lived in Hamilton at the end of his life
 John Brock, MLB catcher for the St. Louis Cardinals
 Alden W. Clausen, president of the World Bank and CEO of Bank of America

References

External links
 City of Hamilton official website

Cities in Illinois
Illinois populated places on the Mississippi River
Cities in Hancock County, Illinois
Populated places established in 1852
1852 establishments in Illinois